John Taylor (by 1493 – 1547 or later), of Hastings, Sussex, was an English politician.

He was a Member (MP) of the Parliament of England for Hastings in 1529 and 1536.

References

15th-century births
16th-century deaths
People from Hastings
English MPs 1529–1536
English MPs 1536